Fernando Aiuti (8 June 1935 – 9 January 2019) was an Italian immunologist and politician. He was the founder and first President of ANLAIDS Association.

Biography 

Born in Urbino in 1935, he graduated with a degree in medicine from Sapienza University of Rome.

In 1991, during a congress at the Fair in Cagliari, the possibility of AIDS being transmitted orally was being discussed. Aiuti suddenly took Rosaria Iardino, an HIV-positive woman, and kissed her on the mouth, trying to convince public opinion that the virus could not be transmitted orally. A journalist photographed the scene and this photo became internationally famous.

Aiuti was head of The People of Freedom list in 2008, and was elected to the municipal council of Rome for The People of Freedom with the mayor Gianni Alemanno, until 2013.

He was appointed chief within the health policies commission of the Roma municipality (2008–2013), were he express against the closing of the public hospital San Giacomo degli Incurabili.

He was full professor at Sapienza University and, in 2010, he was there appointed emeritus professor.

Aiuti died on 9 January 2019 due to an accidental fall at the Gemelli Polyclinic, where he was hospitalized for an ischemic heart disease.

Documentaires 
 2010: "+ o – il sesso confuso. Racconti di mondi nell'era AIDS", direct. Andrea Adriatico and Giulio Maria Corbelli

References

External links 

Italian immunologists
1935 births
2019 deaths
Sapienza University of Rome alumni
People from Urbino
Accidental deaths from falls
Accidental deaths in Italy